The Karamanli Mosque, also known as the Ahmed Pasha Mosque is an 18th-century mosque in Tripoli, Libya.

History 
It is named after Ahmed Karamanli, who started its construction in 1736.

The mosque was vandalized in 2014 during the Libyan civil war. It's ceramic tiles and marble decorations were damaged during the attack, which was condemned by UNESCO.

Description 

The mosque is part of a larger complex which includes a madrasa and tombs of the members of the Karamanli dynasty. The mosque has entrances on three sides.

References 

Mosques in Tripoli, Libya